Randolph Marshall "Randy" Hollerith MStJ (born 1963) is an American Episcopal priest. Since August 2016, he has been the Dean of Washington National Cathedral, the cathedral of the Episcopal Diocese of Washington and the seat of the Presiding Bishop of the Episcopal Church.

Life and career
Hollerith had served as rector of St. James Episcopal Church, Richmond, Virginia, from 2000 to 2016. His brother is Herman Hollerith IV, a retired Bishop of Southern Virginia.

Hollerith earned a bachelor's degree from Denison University and a master's degree from Yale Divinity School. He was ordained in the Episcopal Church as a deacon on June 2, 1990, and as a priest on April 16, 1991; both ordinations were by Peter J. Lee, Bishop of Virginia.

He was appointed as Member to the Order of St John (MStJ) in September 2017.

References

External links

Living people
Denison University alumni
Yale Divinity School alumni
20th-century American Episcopal priests
Episcopal Church in Washington, D.C.
21st-century American Episcopal priests
1963 births